Jamesville Beach Park is an Onondaga County park in LaFayette, New York, just south of the hamlet of Jamesville. A lifeguard oversees the 100 yards of waterfront that includes both shallow and deep areas.

Activities
Jamesville Beach Park offers a wide range of facilities including athletic fields, disc golf, playgrounds, swimming, trails, and volleyball.  Dogs are allowed to be off-leash in designated areas, however must be leashed on the hiking trails.

Events
Jamesville Beach Park is host to events throughout the year that include an Ironman Triathlon and balloon festival in June, and a Canine Carnival in the fall.

References

External links 
 

County parks in New York (state)
DeWitt, New York
Parks in Onondaga County, New York